is a Japanese footballer who plays for  National Police Commissary in the Cambodian League. He used to play for Albirex Niigata Singapore for a season in 2018 with 12 appearances and 4 goals.

Club statistics
Updated to 23 February 2016.

References

External links

Profile at Ventforet Kofu

1996 births
Living people
Association football people from Miyagi Prefecture
Japanese footballers
J1 League players
Ventforet Kofu players
Association football defenders
Expatriate footballers in Cambodia
Japanese expatriate sportspeople in Cambodia